George Vernon Wright (2 June 1900 – 17 April 1978) was an Australian rules footballer who played with Carlton in the Victorian Football League (VFL).

Notes

External links 

Vern Wright's profile at Blueseum

1900 births
1978 deaths
Australian rules footballers from Melbourne
Carlton Football Club players
People from Brunswick, Victoria